Supriya Kumari is an Indian actress. She is known for her role in Indian television series Bairi Piya, Looteri Dulhan, Anudamini and Sanskaar - Dharohar Apnon Ki. She also acted in Hindi film Ekkees Toppon Ki Salaami.

Early life
She was born in the city of Ranchi. Her father works in a government job and her mother is a homemaker. She studied at S.S Doronda Girls High School and completed her graduation from St. Xavier's College, Ranchi. She worked in Doordarshan as a child artist and dancer. She is trained in Kathak.

Career
She started working on the Nagpuri and Khortha albums in Jharkhand. Her chemistry with Bunty Singh and Raman Gupta got admiration among the public. Some albums became hits. She has worked in more than 50 albums. In 2005, She worked in nagpuri film Awara Tore Pyar Mein as a lead with Pankaj Sinha. The film was also directed by Pankaj Sinha. In 2009, she acted in Indian Hindi television series Agle Janam Mohe Bitiya Hi Kijo. Then she acted in Bairi Piya serial in Colors channel. Then she acted in Looteri Dulhan, Anudamini and Mere Sai - Shraddha Aur Saburi. He also acted in Hindi film Zindagi 50 50 and Ekkees Toppon Ki Salaami. She also acted in web series Chhotki Chhatanki.

Filmography

Television

Films

Web series
Chhotki Chhatanki

References

External links

Living people
Indian television actresses
Participants in Indian reality television series
Year of birth missing (living people)